Henry Calvert may refer to:

Henry Calvert (MP) for City of York (UK Parliament constituency)
Henry Calvert (actor) in Hot l Baltimore

See also
Harry Calvert
George Henry Calvert
Henry Calvert Simons